Erodiophyllum (meaning "heron leaf") is a genus of Australian flowering plants in the family Asteraceae.

 Species
 Erodiophyllum acanthocephalum Stapf - Western Australia
 Erodiophyllum elderi F.Muell. - Western Australia, South Australia, New South Wales

References

Asteraceae genera
Astereae
Endemic flora of Australia